Basketball competitions taking place in 1981

Winners of major team competitions 1980–1981

Men 

 Intercontinental Cup : Real Madrid

Women

Player awards (NBA)

Regular Season MVP

NBA Finals MVP

Naismith Memorial Basketball Hall of Fame
Class of 1981:
Tom Barlow
Arad McCutchan
Ferenc Hepp
J. Walter Kennedy

Deaths
 January 1 — Matt Vaniel, American professional player (born 1919)
 January 5 — Joe Dolhon, American professional player (born 1927)
 January 9 — Tommy Byrnes, American professional player (born 1923)
 January 10 — Chink Crossin, American professional player (born 1923)
 January 22 — Russ Wilkins, American professional player (born 1923)
 January 31 — Dick Edwards, American college coach (born 1930)
 February 7 — Connie Kunzmann, American professional player (born 1956)
 February 26 — Bud Lindberg, American professional player (born 1909)
 April 3 — Willis Young, American professional player (born 1911)
 June 7 — Ian Watson, Australian Olympic player (born 1949)
 June 20 — Rock Norman, American college coach (born 1892)
 June 23 — Lou Spicer, American professional player (born 1922)
 July 3 — Artūras Andrulis, Lithuanian national team player (born 1922) 
 July 25 — Bobby Anet, college All-American and national champion (Oregon) (born 1917)
 August 6 — Jack Harvey, college All-American and AAU player (born 1918)
 September 4 — Carl Knowles, American Olympic gold medalist (1936) (born 1910)
 September 10 — John Lance, American college coach (born 1897)
 September 16 — John Azary, American college and professional player (born 1929)
 November 8 — George Nostrand, American professional player (born 1924)

See also
 1981 in sports

References